The Hitman is a 1991 Canadian-American action film starring Chuck Norris. It was directed by Aaron Norris and written by Don Carmody, Robert Geoffrion and Galen Thompson.

Plot
Seattle cop Cliff Garret (Chuck Norris) is severely wounded in a drug bust gone bad—shot by his corrupt partner Ronny “Del” Delany (Michael Parks).

Garret dies momentarily in the emergency room, but is revived with a defibrillator. His police supervisor, Chambers, has the hospital conceal his survival, and Garret is given a new identity. Garret becomes hitman Danny Grogan and, a year later, he infiltrates the organization of mob boss mafioso Marco Luganni (Al Waxman).

The plan is for Grogan to bring together Luganni and his rival, French Canadian mafioso boss André LaCombe (Marcel Sabourin), so they can both be taken down together. After two years of working the plan, a gang of Iranian drug dealers looking to muscle in on everyone's territories suddenly enter the picture when they make a hit on one of Luganni's teams just as they finished making a hit on a team of LaCombe's money carriers.

Grogan plays all parties against one another while befriending a fatherless boy named Tim Murphy (Salim Grant), who lives in the apartment down the hall and is being bullied by a racist white kid in the neighborhood. Tim's mother works three jobs, so he begins spending time with Grogan. Grogan teaches Tim how to fight after seeing him bullied on the street one day. When Tim stands up to the white kid, he gets the best of him, then watches as the white kid is dragged off by his father and beaten for losing the fight. Grogan walks across the street, punches the father in the nose through a screen door, so hard that it knocks the father to the ground, then Grogan walks away.

Grogan's past returns to haunt him in the person of Ronny Delany, who is secretly working with Luganni. Delany recognizes Grogan as Garret, and ties Tim to a chair loaded with explosives in a bid to force Grogan to cooperate. Delany sets off the chair bomb, but Grogan is unharmed and Tim survives.

Grogan turns the tables on them all. At a meeting to set terms of an alliance, Delany has Luganni's men kill LaCombe and his men. Then the Iranians and Delany kill Luganni, but Grogan arrives on the scene and kills all of them. Grogan leaves an enormous sum of money for Tim and his mother in Tim's hospital room. Tim's mother discovers it and is very grateful. In the end, in retribution for what he did to Tim, Grogan blows Delany up while tied to a chair hanging outside a window, much to the chagrin of Chambers.

Cast

Production 
Norris was originally in talks to star in Fifty/Fifty for director Charles Martin Smith, before committing to this picture instead.

Reception

Box office
The film was a box-office success.

Critical response
Had mixed reviews from critics. Movie historian Leonard Maltin called the picture "Fairly awful...Although Norris gets to play a heavy for the first time in over a decade, this "stretch" still isn't enough to distinguish the movie from Chuck's other recent cinematic misses—especially since we know all along it's a ruse. Stuntwork remains the film's only redemption."

On Rotten Tomatoes the film has a score of 13% based on 8 reviews.

See also

 List of American films of 1991
 Chuck Norris filmography

References

External links
 

1991 films
Canadian action films
English-language Canadian films
American action films
1990s action films
American police detective films
Films directed by Aaron Norris
American films about revenge
Films set in Washington (state)
Films produced by Don Carmody
Golan-Globus films
Canadian detective films
1990s English-language films
1990s American films
1990s Canadian films